This is a list of major tourist attractions in the Russian city of Moscow.



Museums

Religious buildings

Convents and monasteries

St. Andronik Monastery
Epiphany Monastery
Chudov Monastery
Danilov Monastery
Donskoy Monastery 
Krutitsy 
Marfo-Mariinsky Convent
Preobrazhenskoye Cemetery
Novodevichy Convent
Novospassky Monastery
Nikolo-Perervinsky Monastery
Simonov Monastery
Sretensky Monastery
Ascension Convent
Vysokopetrovsky Monastery
Zaikonospassky monastery
Chrysostom Monastery

Churches

Saint Basil's Cathedral 
Cathedral of Christ the Saviour 
Yelokhovo Cathedral 
Kazan Cathedral 
Church of the Intercession at Fili
St Clement's Church, Moscow
Nativity Church in Putinki 
Iberian Gate and Chapel 
Church of St. John the Warrior
Church of St. Nicholas in Khamovniki
Church of All Saints, Moscow
Church of the Savior on Bolvany

Religious buildings of other religions
Moscow Cathedral Mosque 
Moscow Choral Synagogue
Cathedral of the Immaculate Conception (Moscow)

Theatres

Moscow Art Theatre
Bolshoi Theatre 
Lenkom Theatre 
Yermolova Theatre
Maly Theatre

Stadiums
Eduard Streltsov Stadium
Luzhniki Stadium
Young Pioneers Stadium
Dynamo Sports Palace
Dynamo Stadium
Lokomotiv Stadium
Khodynka Arena

Film studios
Mosfilm 
Soyuzmultfilm 
Gorky Film Studio

Monuments and sculptures
Worker and Kolkhoz Woman
Monument to Alexander II
Monument to Minin and Pozharsky
Monument to the Conquerors of Space 
Children Are the Victims of Adult Vices by Mikhail Shemyakin, located in Bolotnaya (Marsh) Square

Government buildings
White House, Moscow
Constitutional Court of the Russian Federation

Modern buildings

Triumph-Palace
Golden Ring Hotel

Moscow International Business Center

City Hall and City Duma
Federation Tower
Russia Tower

Other sights

Tallest buildings
Central Moscow Hippodrome
Kitai-gorod
Moscow City Hall
Moscow School of Painting, Sculpture and Architecture
Moscow House of Nationalities
State Public Science and Technical Library
Manege 
Vlakhernskoye-Kuzminki
Lubyanka (KGB)
Moscow Zoo 
Ostankino Tower
Patriarch's Ponds 
Menshikov Tower 
Moscow Gostiny Dvor
Moscow Orphanage
Moscow State Technical University 
Petrovsky Passage
Hotel Metropol
Tsoi Wall

Natural and urban attractions

Avenues, boulevards, and streets

Tsvetnoy Boulevard
Garden Ring
Kutuzovsky Prospekt
Leningradsky Prospekt
New Arbat Street
Tretyakov Drive 
Old Arbat
Cosmonauts Alley
Kuznetsky Most
Boulevard Ring
Great Lubyanka Street
Tverskaya Street
Petrovka Street
Sadovnicheskaya Street
Povarskaya Street

Squares

Red Square
Komsomolskaya Square
Lubyanka Square
Manezhnaya Square
Pushkinskaya Square
Slavyanskaya Square
Theatre Square

Bridges
List of bridges in Moscow

Hills
Poklonnaya Hill
Sparrow Hills

Parks and gardens
All-Russia Exhibition Centre (until 1992 known as the "Exhibition of Achievements of the National Economy", VDNKh)
Bauman Garden
Botanical Garden of Academy of Sciences
Gorky Park
Izmaylovskiy Park
Kolomenskoye
Losiny Ostrov National Park
Neskuchniy Garden
Sokolniki Park
Tsaritsyno Park

Zaryadye Park

Districts
 Arbat
 Izmaylovo
 Khamovniki
 Kitay-gorod
 Krasnoselsky
 Kuzminki
 Lefortovo
 Maryina roshcha
 Meshchansky
 Presnensky
 Sokolniki
 Tagansky
 Tsaritsyno
 Tverskoy
 Yakimanka
 Zamoskvorechye

Moskva River
Vodootvodny Canal
Balchug

Transportal architecture

Moscow rail terminals
The nine Moscow rail terminals are located within a kilometer or two outside of the Garden Ring. 
Below they are listed clockwise, along with a sample of destinations served by each one, 
starting with the three stations at Komsomolskaya Square:
Leningradsky Rail Terminal (Saint Petersburg, Tallinn, Helsinki, Murmansk)
Yaroslavsky Rail Terminal (Yaroslavl, Arkhangelsk, Vladivostok, Beijing)
Kazanskiy Rail Terminal (Kazan, Almaty, Tashkent)
Kursky Rail Terminal (Kursk, Sevastopol, Sochi)
Paveletskiy Rail Terminal (Pavelets, Astrakhan, Baku)
Kievsky Rail Terminal (Kyiv, Odessa, Budapest)
Belorussky Rail Terminal (Minsk, Warsaw, Berlin)
Savyolovskiy Rail Terminal (Savyolovo, Dubna)
Rizhsky Rail Terminal (Riga)

Airports
There are five airports serving Moscow:
Vnukovo International Airport
Sheremetyevo International Airport
Domodedovo International Airport
Zhukovsky International Airport
Ostafievo International Airport

Moscow Metro stations

Komsomolskaya (Line 1)
Krasniye Vorota
Kropotkinskaya
Vorobyovy Gory
Mayakovskaya
Novokuznetskaya
Avtozavodskaya
Park Pobedy
Kiyevskaya(Line 3)
Arbatskaya (Line 3)
Ploshchad Revolyutsii
Elektrozavodskaya
Taganskaya (Line 5)
Komsomolskaya (Line 5)
Prospekt Mira (Line 5)
Novoslobodskaya
Kiyevskaya (Line 5)
Pushkinskaya
Kuznetsky most
Nagatinskaya

Sights which do not exist

Destroyed or lost sights
Rossiya Hotel (demolished in March 2006)
Hotel Moskva (demolished in 2004; rebuild in 2014)
Red Gate
Sukharev Tower

Sights which were never built
Palace of Soviets
Pantheon, Moscow
Tatlin's Tower
Narkomtiazhprom
Zaryadye Administrative Building

 
 List
Tourist attractions